The following is a list of Opel vehicles, including past and present production models, as well as concept vehicles.

Current production vehicles

Former production vehicles
1899-1902 Opel Patent Motor Car, System Lutzmann
1909-1910 Opel 4/8 PS "Doktorwagen"
1911-1920 Opel 5/12 PS "Puppchen"
1922-1924 Opel 10/30 (10/35) PS
1924-1931 Opel 4 PS "Laubfrosch
1928-1929 Opel Regent
1928 Opel RAK
1928 Opel RAK2
1930-1975 Opel Blitz
1935-1940, 1947-1953, 1967-1970 Opel Olympia
1935-1937 Opel P4
1937-1940, 1962-1991 Opel Kadett
1937-1939, 1964-1977 Opel Admiral
1937-1938 Opel Super 6
1939-1970 Opel Kapitän
1953-1986 Opel Rekord
1953-1957 Opel Olympia Rekord
1964-1977 Opel Diplomat
1967-1982 Opel Commodore
1968-1973, 2006-2009 Opel GT
1970-1988 Opel Ascona
1970-1988 Opel Manta
1973-1986 Opel Bedford Blitz
1978-1986 Opel Monza
1978-1993 Opel Senator
1980-2018 Opel Vivaro
1980-1982 Opel Chevette
1983-2018 Opel Corsavan
1986-2003 Opel Omega
1988-2008 Opel Vectra
1989-1997 Opel Calibra
1991-2004 Opel Frontera
1992-2001 Opel Campo
1992-1999 Opel Monterey
1994-2000, 2004-2009 Opel Tigra
1996-1999 Opel Sintra
1997-2001 Opel Arena
1998-2013 Opel Astravan
1999-2019 Opel Zafira Tourer
2000-2015 Opel Agila
2000-2005 Opel Speedster
2003-2017 Opel Meriva
2003-2008 Opel Signum
2006-2015 Opel Antara
2011-2015 Opel Ampera
2012-2019 Opel Adam
2012-2019 Opel Vivaro Tour

See also

List of automobiles
List of concept cars from Opel

References

Opel